Åsmund Apeland (24 March 1930 – 17 October 2010) was a Norwegian politician for the Centre Party.

He served as a deputy representative to the Parliament of Norway from Rogaland during the term 1969–1973. In total he met during 10 days of parliamentary session.

References

1930 births
2010 deaths
Deputy members of the Storting
Centre Party (Norway) politicians
Rogaland politicians